Stratton is a mostly residential eastern suburb of Perth, Western Australia, located within the City of Swan. It was formerly known as Wexcombe; the name Stratton was chosen in 1989 to honour John Peter Stratton, a farmer, businessman and local landowner who was president of the Western Australian Trotting Association from 1930 until 1966.

References

External links

Suburbs of Perth, Western Australia
Suburbs and localities in the City of Swan